Tuzla is a word of Turkish origin which means "place where animals are fed salt". Usually with flat stones where salt is served and the animals may lick from. There are several places that have this as place name:

Locations 
Tuzla, Istanbul – a district and a municipality of Istanbul province, Turkey
Tuzla – a city and municipality in Bosnia and Herzegovina
the city of Tuzla is also seat of Tuzla Canton
Tuzla, Ayvacık, Turkey
Tuzla, Constanța – a commune in Constanţa County, Romania
Lake Tuz – the second largest lake of Turkey
Tuzla Spit – a spit in the Strait of Kerch in Crimea
Tuzla Island – an island in the Strait of Kerch in Crimea
Enkomi or Tuzla – a village just outside the city of Famagusta (Gazimağusa) in north eastern Cyprus
Tuzla – a coastal community in Adana Province of Turkey.
On the Bulgarian Black Sea Coast:
Lake Shabla or Shablenska Tuzla, a saline lake near Shabla in Bulgaria
Taukliman or Nanevska Tuzla, a small lake near Kavarna in Bulgaria
Balchishka Tuzla, a small lake and balneological resort near Balchik in Bulgaria
Tuzla, Kemah

Ships 
MS Tuzla, now called MS Lodbrog, a Romanian ship
MV Tuzla, a Turkish ship